Sergii Tokarnytskyi (born 1 February 1993) is a Ukrainian-born Kazakhstani sprint canoer. He competed in the K-4 1000 m and K-2 200 m events at the 2016 Olympics and finished 10th and 12th, respectively.

Born in Ukraine, he later moved to Kazakhstan and received Kazakhstani citizenship in 2013. His partner Tetiana Yakymenko is also a sprint canoer.

References

External links
 

1993 births
Living people
Kazakhstani male canoeists
Olympic canoeists of Kazakhstan
Canoeists at the 2016 Summer Olympics
People from Kamianske
Canoeists at the 2018 Asian Games
Medalists at the 2018 Asian Games
Asian Games medalists in canoeing
Asian Games gold medalists for Kazakhstan
Asian Games silver medalists for Kazakhstan
Ukrainian emigrants to Kazakhstan